Alfredo Pianta (born 7 May 1901, date of death unknown) was an Argentine weightlifter. He competed at the 1924 Summer Olympics and the 1928 Summer Olympics.

References

External links
 

1901 births
Year of death missing
Argentine male weightlifters
Olympic weightlifters of Argentina
Weightlifters at the 1924 Summer Olympics
Weightlifters at the 1928 Summer Olympics
Place of birth missing
20th-century Argentine people